Cachoeirinha (lit. "Little Waterfall") is a city in the Brazilian state of Rio Grande do Sul. Cachoeirinha is an alternative for the people who want to be near Porto Alegre (capital of Rio Grande do Sul). The city is situated at a strategic point in Rio Grande do Sul state. The city shares borders with Porto Alegre, Canoas, Esteio, Sapucaia do Sul, Gravataí and Alvorada. The city holiday is on May 15, the date on which the city declared its emancipation.

Municipal policy 
The Executive of the Municipality of Cachoeirinha is represented by the mayor and his office of Secretary, following the model proposed by the Federal Constitution. Legislative Power is represented by the City Council, composed of 17 councilors elected to office for four years. The House vote enacts laws for the administration and the Executive, especially the municipal budget.

Population 
One of Cachoeirinha's gaucho municipalities had higher population growth in the 1970s. As of 20, the city has 131,240 inhabitants and 43.9 square kilometers of land area.

Traditions 
Traditions of the gaucho are celebrated by the Cachoeirinha Center Traditions. Rancho da Saudade holds popular events. The Creole round, held annually in the city, received the recognition of the Government of the State of Rio Grande do Sul, and is included in the official calendar. Rodeos held in Cachoeirinha attract people from various cities of Brazil.

Education 
The city has 15 public schools and 8 private at the elementary level and one college.

External links
 Cachoeirinha Mayor's Office (in Portuguese)

References 

Municipalities in Rio Grande do Sul